Mom at Sixteen is a 2005 Lifetime Television film about a sixteen-year-old mother, dealing with problems at school and her decaying relationship with her mother, because of her seeing her boyfriend for the first time since before her son was born.

Plot
Jacey Jeffries (Danielle Panabaker) is a 16-year-old high school student and the mother of a baby boy named Charley. Instead of giving him up for adoption as planned, she chose to keep the baby. Her mother, Terry (Mercedes Ruehl) pretends the infant is hers to allow Jacey to finish high school and lead a relatively normal life and graduate.

When Jacey attends a new school, she criticizes several of the students for their promiscuous behavior during a class discussion. Jacey's opinions lead Donna Cooper (Jane Krakowski), the Health teacher, to take a special interest in Jacey. Jacey's comments are unique in that she does not have an interest in following what her classmates say. The teacher's husband, the swim coach Bob (Colin Ferguson), convinces Jacey to join the swim team. Jacey passes out after taking tranquilizers stolen from her mother and ends up in the hospital.  Donna and Bob are unable to conceive and are devastated when they discover their latest round of In-Vitro Fertilization has failed.

Jacey feels that matters are unresolved with Charley's father, Brad. It is apparent that Jacey was and still is in love with him. Jacey feels guilty because Brad is unaware that Jacey gave birth. Brad currently attends college. When Jacey attempts to call him, she becomes nervous upon hearing his voice and hangs up.

Donna sees Jacey with Charley, and asks if Jacey is his mother. Although Jacey lied, many students from the school witnessed the interrogation and believe Jacey is really the mother. She begins to get teased at school for her behavior. Her secret is found out at school, when the students were asked about how guys react to what girls wear. When other students criticize her for her hypocrisy, she goes to a mothers meeting for teen mothers.

After being teased at school, she leaves abruptly to see Brad. They spend the day together, and are about to have sex, when Jacey announces that the reason she left him was because she got pregnant. Brad takes the news badly and leaves. Jacey returns home and has a huge argument with Terry who hands her Charley and tells her to handle things on her own, angry that Jacey doesn't understand the sacrifices she has made to help Jacey have a normal life. Exhausted and confused, she turns to Donna for help and advice. Donna advocates for Jacey telling her mother that she wants to be Charley's mom to which Terry gives a speech about the sacrifices it takes to be a 'real Mom'.

A few weeks later, Brad arrives at Jacey's house to apologize and tells Terry that he will make it work between Jacey and him. However, when Jacey makes a surprise visit to his school, she finds out Brad's parents will only help if a DNA test is done to prove Brad is the father; Jacey feels betrayed and leaves him.

At school, Jacey gives a speech on pregnancy and teen sex, using examples from her friends from the teen mother's meeting. She gets applause and respect from her former bullies for being honest and sensible. Afterwards, Macy, her sister, gives her a DVD she had put together for Charley for him to watch when he is older. Watching it together with Terry, the two reconcile.

Later, Donna receives a call that there is a baby waiting to be adopted. Overjoyed, Donna and Bob go to adopt the child, only to find that it is Terry and Jacey who have decided to give him up to give him his best chance.

She apparently remains a part of Charley's life, as five years later she's there at Charley's first day at kindergarten, Donna and Bob have a new baby daughter, and Bob is shown recording Charley and asks Charley to talk about himself. "I'm Charley Cooper and I'm 5 years old, I got a new baby sister." Charley tells the camera that he has two mommies and that Jacey is his special mommy and Bob asks why. Charley replies, "because I'm the only one who knows how her heart feels from inside her." It is indicated in one scene that this is in fact the couple that was originally going to adopt him before Jacey changed her mind.

Cast
 Danielle Panabaker as Jacey Jeffries
 Jane Krakowski as Donna Cooper 
 Clare Stone as Macy Jeffries
 Tyler Hynes as Brad
 Colin Ferguson as Bob Cooper
 Mercedes Ruehl as Terry Jeffries
 Hollis McLaren as Marlene
 Rejean Cournoyer as Mr. Cheevers 
 Dawn McKelvie Cyr as Gretchen 
 Megan Edwards as Linda
 Matthew MacCaull as Dr. Hughes
 Sabrina Jalees as Sarah
 Deborah Allen as Pauline
 Anastasia Hill as Trea
 Leah Fassett as Gena
 Scott Smith as Charley

External links
 

2005 television films
2005 films
2000s teen drama films
American teen drama films
Lifetime (TV network) films
Teenage pregnancy in film
Teenage pregnancy in television
Films about dysfunctional families
Films about adoption
Films directed by Peter Werner
American drama television films
2000s American films
2000s high school films